Marchen Neel Gjertsen (born September 16, 1985, in Glostrup) is a Danish journalist, who has served as editor-in-chief of Jyllands-Posten since 2021. In 2005, she ran unsuccessfully in the municipal elections for the Odense Municipality as a candidate for the Red–Green Alliance.

References 

1985 births
Living people
21st-century Danish journalists
21st-century Danish newspaper editors
Jyllands-Posten editors